Big Hero 6: The Series is an American animated television series developed by Mark McCorkle and Bob Schooley for Disney Television Animation, based on the film which in turn is based on the characters created by Steven T. Seagle and Duncan Rouleau (credited to Man of Action) and published by Marvel Comics. It premiered with a one hour pilot on November 20, 2017 on Disney XD and premiering again, on June 9, 2018 on Disney Channel. Starting on September 3, 2019, the series began to air on both networks, simultaneously. Taking place after the events of the film, the show follows the continuing adventures of Hiro Hamada and his robot companion Baymax who, together with their friends, fight crime in the city of San Fransokyo.

The series was renewed for a second season, months before the first season's premiere with a third season announced shortly before the second season premiere.

On January 28, 2021, members of the cast stated that the series would not return for a fourth season, with the final episode airing on February 15, 2021.

Series overview

Episodes

Season 1 (2017–18)

Season 2 (2019–20)
Bob Schooley announced that unlike season one, season two would be split into two story arcs with the first one titled City of Monsters and the second one titled Fugitives.

Season 3 (2020–21)
Beginning with "Mayor for a Day", episodes now have a running time of 11 minutes instead of 22. However, to fit the half-hour timeslot, episodes are stitched together as segments of longer 22-minute episodes.

Shorts

Baymax and
A series of short-form episodes began airing on the Disney Channel YouTube channel on May 31, 2018, though they premiered in Europe months earlier.

Baymax Dreams
A three-episode short series called Baymax Dreams premiered on September 15, 2018 simultaneously on Disney Channel and YouTube. The episodes are computer-animated and made through Unity. A second order of episodes was announced, this time featuring a digital Fred interacting with Baymax.

Big Chibi 6 The Shorts
In early November of 2018, Disney Channel started airing Big Chibi 6 The Shorts, a series loosely based on the opening segment from the episode "Fan Friction". This series depicts the cast of Big Hero 6 in comical "chibi-fied" situations. The chibi animation is used in the closing credits of season 2 and season 3 episodes. Following the release of the series, "chibi-fied" shorts based on other Disney Channel titles, such as Amphibia and Phineas and Ferb were released, known as Chibi Tiny Tales. This was followed by a full fledged monthly television series titled Chibiverse.

Baymax & Mochi
During the premiere of season two, a new series started called Baymax & Mochi. This series solely focuses on the titular duo and is done with cel shading.

Disney Random Rings
Short segments that originated from Big City Greens that feature Disney Channel characters calling one another and set to Adobe Flash animation. There are several other Disney Random Rings shorts, but this is the first to feature characters from Big Hero 6: The Series.

Ratings
 

| link2             = #Season 2 (2019–20)
| episodes2         = 23
| start2            = 
| end2              = 
| startrating2      = 0.21
| endrating2        = 
| viewers2          = |2}} 
| link3             = #Season 3 (2020–21)
| episodes3         = 10
| start3            = 
| end3              = 
| startrating3      = 0.12
| endrating3        = 0.07
| viewers3          = |2}} 
}}

Notes

References

Big Hero 6 (franchise)
Big Hero 6: The Series
Big Hero 6: The Series